The 2022 Campeonato Brasileiro Série A (officially the Brasileirão Assaí 2022 for sponsorship reasons) was the 66th season of the Campeonato Brasileiro Série A, the top level of professional football in Brazil, and the 19th edition in a double round-robin since its establishment in 2003. The competition began on 9 April and ended on 13 November 2022.

The top six teams as well as the 2022 Copa do Brasil champions qualified for the Copa Libertadores. The next six best-placed teams not qualified for Copa Libertadores qualified for the Copa Sudamericana and the last four were relegated to Série B for 2023.

Palmeiras won the competition, securing their eleventh league title with three rounds to go after Internacional's 1–0 defeat to América Mineiro on 2 November. Atlético Mineiro were the defending champions.

Teams
Twenty teams competed in the league – the top sixteen teams from the previous season, as well as four teams promoted from the Série B.

Botafogo and Coritiba became the first two clubs to be promoted on 15 November 2021, after the former achieved a 2–1 home win against Operário Ferroviário, while the latter defeated Brasil de Pelotas by 2–1 a day before and saw CRB lose their match against Brusque. Goiás achieved promotion seven days later, after a 2–0 away win over fellow promotion contenders Guarani. Avaí was the last team promoted on 28 November, after a 2–1 comeback win over Sampaio Corrêa.

Number of teams by state

Stadiums and locations

Personnel and kits

Managerial changes

Notes

Foreign players
The clubs can have a maximum of five foreign players in their Campeonato Brasileiro squads per match, but there is no limit of foreigners in the clubs' squads.

Players holding Brazilian dual nationality
They do not take foreign slot.

  Aloísio (América Mineiro)
  Marlos (Athletico Paranaense)
  Júnior Moraes (Corinthians)
  Alan (Fluminense)
  Johnny Cardoso (Internacional)
  Chico (Juventude)
  André Anderson (São Paulo)
  Éder (São Paulo)
  João Moreira (São Paulo)

Standings

League table

Positions by round
The table lists the positions of teams after each week of matches.In order to preserve chronological evolvements, any postponed matches are not included to the round at which they were originally scheduled, but added to the full round they were played immediately afterwards.

Results

Season statistics

Top scorers

Source: Soccerway

Top assists

Source: Soccerway

Hat-tricks

Notes
(H) – Home team(A) – Away team

Clean sheets

Source: FBref.com

Awards

Monthly awards

Annual awards

References

2022 in Brazilian football
Brazil
Campeonato Brasileiro Série A seasons
2022 in Brazilian football leagues